The Mayfair Open, also sometimes referred to as the Sanford Women's Open, was a golf tournament on the LPGA Tour, played only in 1959. It was played at the Mayfair Country Club in Sanford, Florida. Marlene Hagge won the event.

Barbara Romack, winner of the U.S. Women's Amateur in 1954, made her professional debut at the event.

References

External links
History of Mayfair Country Club

Former LPGA Tour events
Golf in Florida
Sanford, Florida
Women's sports in Florida